Kyungon is a village in Kanbalu Township, Shwebo District, in the Sagaing Region of northern-central Myanmar.

Notes

External links
"Kyungon Map — Satellite Images of Kyungon" Maplandia World Gazetteer

Populated places in Sagaing Region
Shwebo District